List of ships built by Aberdeen shipbuilders Hall, Russell & Company, from yard number 901 to 1000.

The ships built in the sequence 901 to 1000 cover the period 1962 — 1990. Yard number 1000 represents the last vessel built by Hall, Russell & Company (then trading as AP Appledore (Aberdeen). The yard would close in 1992.

One vessel built during this period by Hall, Russell & Company has become well known in popular culture, a fisheries protection vessel built for the Scotland Fisheries Protection Agency as Westra (Yard number 962). This vessel was bought by the Sea Shepherd Conservation Society and initially renamed in honour of Robert Hunter. It is currently named the MY Steve Irwin, and is involved with anti whaling protests and general conservation work.

Notes

 Yard Numbers 923, 952 and 968 unused, likely cancelled. 
 Yard Numbers 996, 997 and 999 were allocated for significant refurbishment and conversion contracts, rather than complete builds (detailed above). 
 Yard Number 996 Ballantine never completed - partially completed hull imported from Norway in 1991, project cancelled after customer was declared bankrupt, partially completed hull sent to Husumer Schiffswerft for completion. 
 Yard Number 998 allocated to Sabine in 1989, order cancelled.

References

Bibliography

Ships built in Scotland